The rural district of Hallaton existed in Leicestershire, England from 1894 to 1935.  It included the following civil parishes, which were the parts of the Uppingham Rural Sanitary District in Leicestershire.

Blaston
Bringhurst
Drayton
Great Easton
Hallaton
Horninghold
Medbourne
Nevill Holt
Stockerston

In 1935 it was merged into the Market Harborough Rural District, under the review caused by the Local Government Act 1929. It now (after 1974) forms part of the non-metropolitan district of Harborough.

External links
Hallaton RD 

History of Leicestershire
Local government in Leicestershire
Districts of England created by the Local Government Act 1894
Rural districts of England
Harborough District